Minutoli is a surname that may refer to the following people:

The von Minutoli family of Switzerland, which includes
Heinrich Menu von Minutoli, (12 May 1772 – 16 September 1846) a Prussian Generalmajor, explorer and archaeologist
Julius Rudolph Ottomar Freiherr von Minutoli (30 August 1804 – 5 November 1860), a Prussian chief of police, diplomat, scientist, and author, and draughtsman
Enrico Minutoli (died 1412), an Italian Cardinal
Michael Minutoli, inventor of the Minutoli instrument, a modified phonograph turntable used by noise performer Emil Beaulieau